Highway 156 (AR 156, Ark. 156, Hwy. 156, and Baggett Street) is a former state highway in Prairie Grove, Arkansas. Between 1980 and 2007, the highway was maintained by the Arkansas State Highway and Transportation Department (AHTD), now known as the Arkansas Department of Transportation (ArDOT).

Route description
The highway began at US 62 in Prairie Grove and ran south to a factory.

History
Highway 156 was created upon the request of Prairie Grove to provide a state maintained road for a new factory in the town in 1980. The city later requested the highway's maintenance responsibilities be turned over to their jurisdiction, a request granted by the Arkansas State Highway Commission in 2007.

Major intersections

See also

References

156
Transportation in Washington County, Arkansas